Noël Quillerier (1594 (baptised August 1) - April 3, 1669) was a French painter who also served as a valet de chambre for the king. A native of Orléans, in 1631 he married Charlotte Lerambert, the sister of sculptor Louis Lerambert.  Their daughter Marguerite married the sculptor Antoine Coysevox; their son Jérôme (sometimes called Hiérosme), baptized February 19, 1639, was also listed as a painter, though none of his works are known to have survived.  Among Quillerier's pupils was Noël Coypel.  He died in Paris.

Works

Saint Paul, oil on panel (118x90 cm), Musée des beaux-arts de Nancy, once attributed to Phillip of Champagne.
Saint Paul in Meditation, oil in panel (131x97 cm), Louvre, Paris

References
Saint Paul in Meditation, at the Louvre

1594 births
1669 deaths
17th-century French painters
French male painters
Artists from Orléans